Cheyyeru is a village in Katrenikona Mandal, located in Dr. B.R. Ambedkar Konaseema district of the Indian state of Andhra Pradesh.

References 

Villages in Konaseema district